Heterogen longispira is a species of operculate freshwater snail, aquatic gastropod mollusks in the family Viviparidae.

Heterogen longispira is the only species in the genus Heterogen.

 Distribution Heterogen longispira'' is endemic to Lake Biwa, Japan.

References

External links

Viviparidae